Lo Recordings is a label founded in 1995 by Jon Tye. They are noted for their strong visual style thanks to Non-Format, with whom they work very closely and won a D&AD award for several of their releases sleeves.

Musical style
Lo recordings mainly specialize in left-field electronic music  with artists such as Grimes, Black Devil and Susumu Yokota, Fischerspooner amongst many others. This is reflected in the company's motto that reads "Lo Recordings - Provider of quality esoteric music since 1995".

Along with electronic music Lo Recordings has also been known to release various other genres. This is exemplified by bands such as The Chap who have three albums on Lo with one forthcoming expected in mid-2012.

Recently Lo have developed two new labels: Loaf, for new artists and Loeb, for vinyl 12’s. There is a sister company Hub 100 Publishing ltd and in the last few years have developed a production music library imprint called Lo Editions in conjunction with BMGZomba production music.

Lo recordings also runs Lo & Behold, a shop and Creative Space in London showcasing a diverse selection of exhibitions, installations and one off events.

Artists
Lo Recordings has worked with many artists and has over 70 releases spread over three sub-labels. These include many full albums and compilations. Some of the artists associated with Lo Recordings are:

The Adamski Kid
Four Tet
The Chap
Susumu Yokota
Black Devil
Rothko
Aphex Twin
Thurston Moore
Luke Vibert
Jean-Jacques Perrey
Cursor Miner
Hairy Butter
Mileece
Tony F Wilson
Red Snapper
Grimes
Zoon van snooK
Astronauts (band)
 Tom Furse

See also
 List of record labels
 List of electronic music record labels
 Non-Format

References

External links
Official Site
Lo Recording's Myspace
Parent Company Site

British independent record labels
Record labels established in 1995
Electronic music record labels